Tobolice  is a village in the administrative district of Gmina Rzekuń, within Ostrołęka County, Masovian Voivodeship, in east-central Poland.

The village has an approximate population of 400.

References

Tobolice